The Ouija Board Handicap is an American Thoroughbred horse race held annually on Memorial Day at Lone Star Park in Grand Prairie, Texas.

A Grade III event since 2003, it is contested on turf over a distance of one mile (8 furlongs) and is open to fillies and mares, age three and older.

Inaugurated in 1997 as the Fort Worth Handicap, it was contested  at a distance of   miles until 1999 when it was renamed the Prestonwood Distaff Handicap and set at a distance of one mile. From 2000 through 2006 it was raced as the Winstar Distaff Handicap. In 2007, the race was renamed to honor superstar filly Ouija Board, the European Horse of the Year in 2004 and 2006 who won the Breeders' Cup Filly & Mare Turf in 2004 when the Breeders' Cup races were hosted  by Lone Star Park.

Records
Speed  record: (at current distance of 1 mile)
 1:32.81 - Wasted Tears (2009) (New stakes and course record)

Most wins:
 Wasted Tears (2009, 2010, 2011)

Most wins by an owner:
 Bart B. Evans (2009, 2010, 2011)

Most wins by a jockey:
 2- Cliff Berry (2001, 2010)

Most wins by a trainer:

 2 - Bart B. Evans (2009, 2010)
 2 - Steve Asmussen (1999, 2004)
 2 - Donnie K. Von Hemel (2001, 2008)

Winners

References
 The 2008 Ouija Board Handicap at the NTRA

Graded stakes races in the United States
1997 establishments in Texas
Mile category horse races for fillies and mares
Recurring sporting events established in 1997
Horse races in Texas